Seyitgazi is a town and district of Eskişehir Province in the Central Anatolia region of Turkey. The central town of Seyitgazi lies at a distance of  towards the south from the province capital of Eskişehir. According to 2010 census, population of the district is 16,222 of which 2,890 live in the town of Seyitgazi.

Apart from the central town of Seyitgazi, the district has two dependent townships with own municipalities. These are Kırka and Doğançayır. The district also has 46 villages.

Places of interest
The town occupies the site of the Byzantine city of Nakoleia, and was named after the 8th-century Muslim saint (seyyid) and warrior Battal Gazi, who fell in a battle nearby in 740. A complex dedicated to Battal Gazi and containing his tomb, a mosque, a medrese, cells and ceremonial rooms for dervishes as well as charitable services for the community such as kitchens and a bakery was built in 1208 on a hill overlooking the town by Ümmühan Hatun, wife of the Seljuk sultan Gıyaseddin Keyhüsrev I and further extended in 1511 by the Ottoman sultan Bayezid II. The shrine and the adjoining complex remain popular with local as well as foreign visitors.

History
From 1867 until 1922, Seyitgazi was part of Hüdavendigâr vilayet.

Archaeological discoveries 
In August 2019, researchers head by Prof. Murat Türkteki announced the discovery of two skeletons dating back about 5,000 years in the same sarcophagus in Early Bronze Age settlement Küllüoba. Excavators assumed that one of the skeletons was a 13-year-old girl and other was a man in his late 30s.

In August 2020, archaeologists head by Prof. Murat Türktaki revealed a 5,000-year-old paint palette made of stone in the Seyitgazi district at the Küllüoba site. According to Türktaki, this palette was used for painting dishes.

In March 2021, discovery of the marble sarcophagus  which is 1.5 meters tall and 33 centimeters wide in the Seyitgazi district at the Küllüoba site was announced by the municipal workers while construction work.

Notes

References

External links

 District governor's official website 
 District municipality's official website 
 Map of Seyitgazi district
 Many pictures of the Battal Gazi complex and Seyitgazi village

Towns in Turkey
Eskişehir
Populated places in Eskişehir Province
Districts of Eskişehir Province